

g

ga

gab-gad
gabapentin (INN)
gabexate (INN)
Gabitril
gaboxadol (INN)
gacyclidine (INN)
gadobenic acid (INN)
gadobutrol (INN)
gadodiamide (INN)
gadofosveset trisodium (USAN)
gadopenamide (INN)
gadopentetic acid (INN)
gadoteric acid (INN)
gadoteridol (INN)
gadoversetamide (INN)
gadoxetate disodium (USAN)
gadoxetic acid (INN)

gal-gan
galamustine (INN)
galantamine (INN)
galdansetron (INN)
galgenprostucel-L (USAN)
galiximab (USAN)
gallamine triethiodide (INN)
gallium (67 Ga) citrate (INN)
gallopamil (INN)
galocitabine (INN)
galosemide (INN)
galsulfase (USAN)
galtifenin (INN)
Galzin
Gamene
gamfexine (INN)
gamithromycin (USAN, INN)
gamma-hydroxybutyrate
gamolenic acid (INN)
Gamophen
ganaxolone (INN)
ganciclovir (INN)
ganefromycin (INN)
ganglefene (INN)
ganirelix (INN)
ganitumab (USAN)
Ganite
Gantanol
gantenerumab (USAN, INN)
Gantrisin
galyfilcon A (USAN)

gap-gav
gapicomine (INN)
Garamycin
garenoxacin (INN)
garnocestim (USAN)
Gastrocrom
Gastrografin
Gastromark
Gastrovist
gataparsen (USAN)
gatifloxacin (INN)
gavestinel (INN)
gavilimomab (INN)
Gaviscon (GlaxoSmithKline US, Reckitt Benckiser UK, Prestige Brands Ca)

ge

gec-gem
geclosporin (INN)
gedocarnil (INN)
gefarnate (INN)
gefitinib (USAN)
geldanamycin (INN)
gemazocine (INN)
gemcabene calcium (USAN)
gemcadiol (INN)
gemcitabine (INN)
gemeprost (INN)
Gemhexal (Hexal Australia) [Au]. Redirects to gemfibrozil.
gemfibrozil (INN)
Gemonil (Abbott Laboratories)
gemtuzumab ozogamicin (INN)
Gemzar (Eli Lilly)

gen-ger
Gen-Xene
Genapax
Gencept
Generlac
Genesa
Gengraf
Genoptic
Genotropin
Gentacidin
Gentafair
Gentak
gentamicin (INN)
gentisic acid (INN)
Geocillin
Geodon
Geopen
gepefrine (INN)
gepirone (INN)
Geref
Gerimal
Germa-medica
geroquinol (INN)

ges-gev
gestaclone (INN)
gestadienol (INN)
gestodene (INN)
gestonorone caproate (INN)
gestrinone (INN)
gevotroline (INN)

gi
giparmen (INN)
giracodazole (INN)
giractide (INN)
girentuximab (INN)
giripladib (USAN)
girisopam (INN)
gisadenafil (USAN, INN)
gitalin, amorphous (INN)
gitaloxin (INN)
gitoformate (INN)
givinostat (INN)

gl

gla-gle
glafenine (INN)
glaspimod (INN)
glaziovine (INN)
Gleevec (Novartis)
glemanserin (INN)
glembatumumab (USAN, INN)
glenvastatin (INN)
gleptoferron (INN)

gli
Gliadel Wafer (Guilford Pharmaceuticals)
Gliadel
gliamilide (INN)
glibenclamide (INN)
glibornuride (INN)
glibutimine (INN)
glicaramide (INN)
glicetanile (INN)
gliclazide (INN)
glicondamide (INN)
glidazamide (INN)
gliflumide (INN)
glimepiride (INN)
glipalamide (INN)
glipizide (INN)
gliquidone (INN)
glisamuride (INN)
glisentide (INN)
glisindamide (INN)
glisolamide (INN)
glisoxepide (INN)

glo
globin zinc insulin injection (INN)
Glofil-125
gloxazone (INN)
gloximonam (INN)

glu
Glucagen
glucagon (INN)
glucalox (INN)
glucametacin (INN)
Glucamide
glucarpidase (INN)
Glucobay (Bayer AG). Redirects to acarbose.
Glucohexal (Hexal Australia) [Au]. Redirects to metformin.
Glucophage (Sanofi)
glucosamine (INN)
Glucoscan (Bristol-Myers Squibb)
glucose oxidase (USAN)
glucosulfamide (INN)
glucosulfone (INN)
Glucotrol (Pfizer)
Glucovance (Bristol-Myers Squibb)
glucurolactone (INN)
glucuronamide (INN)
glufanide disodium (USAN)
glufosfamide (INN)
glunicate (INN)
glusoferron (INN)
glutaral (INN)
glutaurine (INN)
glutethimide (INN)

gly
glyburide, known also as Diabeta (Sanofi-Aventis) and sulfonylurea
glybuthiazol (INN)
glybuzole (INN)
glyclopyramide (INN)
glycobiarsol (INN)
GlycoLax
Glycoprep
glycopyrronium bromide (INN)
Glycort
glycyclamide (INN)
glyhexamide (INN)
glymidine sodium (INN)
Glynase
glyoctamide (INN)
glypinamide (INN)
glyprothiazol (INN)
Glyset
glysobuzole (INN)

go-gr
Go-Evac
gold (198 Au), colloidal (INN)
golimumab (INN)
golnerminogene pradenovec (USAN, INN)
golotimod (USAN, INN)
Golytely (Braintree Laboratories)
gomiliximab (USAN)
gonadorelin (INN)
Gonal-F (Serono)
goralatide (INN)
goserelin (INN)
gosogliptin (USAN, INN)
goxalapladib (USAN, INN)
gramicidin S (INN)
gramicidin (INN)
granisetron (INN)
Gravol (Church & Dwight)
grepafloxacin (INN)
Grifulvin V
Gris-Peg
Grisactin
griseofulvin (INN)

gu

gua

guab-guam
guabenxan (INN)
guacetisal (INN)
guafecainol (INN)
guaiactamine (INN)
guaiapate (INN)
guaietolin (INN)
guaifenesin (INN)
guaifylline (INN)
guaimesal (INN)
guaisteine (INN)
guamecycline (INN)

guan
guanabenz (INN)
guanacline (INN)
guanadrel (INN)
guanazodine (INN)
guancidine (INN)
guanclofine (INN)
guanethidine (INN)
guanfacine (INN)
guanisoquine (INN)
guanoclor (INN)
guanoctine (INN)
guanoxabenz (INN)
guanoxan (INN)
guanoxyfen (INN)

guar
guaraprolose (INN)

gus
gusperimus (INN)

gv-gy
GVS
Gynazole-1
Gyne-Lotrimin
Gyne-Sulf
Gynix
Gynodiol
Gynorest